Auxarthron is a genus of fungi within the Onygenaceae family.

References

External links
Auxarthron at Index Fungorum

Onygenales
Eurotiomycetes genera